Torulatar Bhoot (The ghost of Torulata) is a Bengali horror thriller film directed by Deb Roy, produced by Sarit Palchoudhury and Rabindranath Samanta. This film was released on 24 September 2021 under the banner of  Green Motion Pictures. Music of the movie was composed by Upal Sengupta.

Plot
A Group of people come to a village for picnic. They are the members of a voluntary organisation, Prerana. They come to know that before twenty years ago a young lady Torulata was killed in a pond of this village. Nowadays several teenagers drowned and later died in the same pond. Villagers think that the ghost of Torulata exists at the bottom of the pond and is responsible for the death of those teenagers. But what is the real incident?

Cast
 Indraneil Sengupta as Viki Ghosh
 Ishaa Saha as Kamalkali
 Basabdatta Chatterjee as Monorama
 Pradip Mukherjee as Purohit Ghoshal
 Dipanwita Hazari as Bardi
 Rahul Dev Bose as Sayan
 Sumit Samaddar
 Prasanta Sutradhar
 Kripa Bindu
 Prosun Saha

References

External links
 

2021 films
Bengali-language Indian films
2021 horror thriller films
2020s Bengali-language films
Indian horror thriller films